The White Conduit House was a building in Islington, London. From the late 17th century, it was a leisure resort away from the city centre; it was demolished in 1849.

History
There were springs and conduit-heads in the area in the medieval period. A conduit house on the site originally supplied water to Greyfriars Monastery at Newgate. From the 1400s, it also supplied water for a Carthusian priory. It was repaired in 1641 by Thomas Sutton, founder of the London Charterhouse on the site of the priory, to which it supplied water until about 1654, when water was taken from the New River.

From the late 17th century, the site was a leisure resort away from the city centre. In 1754, the White Conduit House was advertised as having for its fresh attractions a long walk, a circular fish-pond, a number of pleasant shady arbours, hot loaves and butter, coffee, tea, and other liquors, unadulterated cream, and a handsome long room, with "copious prospects, and airy situation".

Cricket was played on a nearby field, White Conduit Fields; a club was formed here, the White Conduit Club, that eventually became Marylebone Cricket Club.

The house was rebuilt in 1828, the new building containing a ballroom. By 1833, the area was regarded as less respectable than formerly. The building was demolished in 1849; a pub now stands on the site, at the corner of Barnsbury Road and Dewey Road.

References

Tea houses of the United Kingdom
Former buildings and structures in the London Borough of Islington
Buildings and structures demolished in 1849
Demolished buildings and structures in London